Monsignor Camille Moubarak  (born December 15, 1947, in Kfarnis, Lebanon) is a Lebanese political scientist, academic, poet, writer, and Maronite Priest. His has written and lectured widely on Lebanese politics, peace and democracy.

Early life and education 
Camille Moubarak was born on December 15, 1947, the son of Moubarak Moubarak and Zahia Chahine. He was homeschooled by his parents until he joined the school of Lebanese Missionaries in Jounieh, Lebanon, and subsequently attended public school in Ain Dara, and then secondary public school in Furn el Chebbak, where he graduated with a concentration in philosophy. He later attended the University of St. Joseph of the Jesuits in Beirut, where he majored in Literature and graduated with a PhD. His dissertation was titled "Ibn Khaldun's Racial Discrimination". Afterwards, he studied for another major in Philosophy and Theology at the Holy Spirit University of Kaslik in Jounieh, before travelling to Rome to join the Pontifical Lateran University, studying economic, political and reformatory theories, and graduating with a doctoral degree in Social Ecclesial Doctrine. His thesis was entitled "The Issue of Minorities between Politics and Religion."

Teaching career 
Moubarak attended the Protestant Institute in Beirut, the Lebanese League School, College Notre-Dame de Jamhour (Jesuits school), and La Sagesse Brasilia in Beirut. From a school teacher to a college professor at the Institute of Theology - University of St. Joseph (Jesuits order), and at La Sagesse University, Moubarak taught anthropology, ethics, multiculturalism and political science.

He became the administrator of La Sagesse School in Beirut from 1987 to 1997, then La Sagesse School of Jdeideh, Metn, from 1997 to 1999. He was the President of Sagesse University between 2011 and 2015, as had served previously as Dean of the Faculty of Political Science and International Relations for 15 years. In 2015 he received the Deanship of the Doctoral Institute at Sagesse University.

Priesthood  
He was ordained as a priest on June 9, 1984, and served in a number of Maronite parishes within the archdiocese of Beirut, including Saint Joseph at Ashrafieh, Our Lady at Ain Saadeh, Saint George at Beit Mery, Saint Antony at Jdeideh El Metn and lately Our Lady at Hadath. He was elevated to Chorbishop on October 7, 2012.

Socio-political writings 

Moubarak's socio-political writings are influenced by Jürgen Habermas and Alasdair MacIntyre, and are themed around liberalism, communitarianism, and cultural integration. In his writing, Moubarak advocates for human rights, respect of motherhood, uplifting of the disenfranchised, the importance of child care, and environmental protection. He endorses a federal system of government in Lebanon, arguing that this could solve cultural issues and sectarianism.

Publications 
In poetry:

Moubarak, Camille (2000). Disappointment, Al-Hikmat Edition, Beirut.
Moubarak, Camille (1998). Letters to me from me, Al-Hikmat Edition, Beirut.
Moubarak, Camille (1996). Travel without Distances, Al-Hikmat Edition, Beirut.
Moubarak, Camille (1992). When the Wounds Bloom, Al-Hikmat Edition, Beirut.
Moubarak, Camille (1987). Lanterns that don’t turn off, Al-Hikmat Edition, Beirut.

In Prose:

Moubarak, Camille (2017). When There Is an Abundance of Sour Grapes - Beirut 2007-2016, Al-Hikmat Edition, Beirut.
Moubarak, Camille (2015). Fruits of Trials and Tribulations, Volume III, Al-Hikmat Edition, Beirut.
Moubarak, Camille (2013). Fruits of Trials and Tribulations, Volume II, Al-Hikmat Edition, Beirut.
Moubarak, Camille (2012). Fruits of Trials and Tribulations, Volume I, Al-Hikmat Edition, Beirut.
Moubarak, Camille (2010). Truth and Safety to All of You, Al-Hikmat Edition, Beirut.
Moubarak, Camille (2009). The Cultural Roots of the Lebanese Wars, in collaboration with Dr Jean Boulos, Al-Hikmat Edition, Beirut.
Moubarak, Camille (2007). Principles of the Social Ecclesial Doctrine, Al-Hikmat Edition, Beirut.
Moubarak, Camille (2007). I Know What I believe in, Al-Hikmat Edition, Beirut.
Moubarak, Camille (2005). Reflections of the Holy Week, Al-Hikmat Edition, Beirut.
Moubarak, Camille (2005). Meditations on the Silence of Words, Al-Hikmat Edition, Beirut.
Moubarak, Camille (2004). Dialogue without Colors, Al-Hikmat Edition, Beirut.
Moubarak, Camille (2002). The Problem of Minorities and the Frameworks for Intercultural Coexistence (French), Al-Hikmat Edition, Beirut.
Moubarak, Camille (2001). Multiculturalism in the Contemporary Political Mind, Al-Hikmat Edition, Beirut.
Moubarak, Camille (2001). Anthropology and Social Ethics, Al-Hikmat Edition, Beirut.
Moubarak, Camille (1999). Before the Wheat Spikes are Mature, Al-Hikmat Edition, Beirut.
Moubarak, Camille (1994). God on the Tongues of Poets, Al-Hikmat Edition, Beirut.
Moubarak, Camille (1976). The Story of the Lebanese Reality.

References 

1947 births
Lebanese philosophers
Living people
Philosophers of social science
Holy Spirit University of Kaslik alumni